Tomek Bartoszyński (born May 16, 1957 as Tomasz Bartoszyński in Warsaw) is a Polish-American mathematician who works in set theory.

He is the son of statistician Robert Bartoszyński.

Biography
Bartoszyński studied mathematics at the University of Warsaw from 1976 to 1981, and worked there from 1981 to 1987.   In 1984 he defended his Ph.D. thesis Combinatorial aspects of measure and category; his advisor was Wojciech Guzicki. In 2004 he received his habilitation from the Polish Academy of Sciences.

From 1986 onwards he worked in the United States: he taught at the University of California in Berkeley and Davis.  From 1990 to 2006 he was professor (full professor from 1998 on) at Boise State University.   In 1990/91 he visited the Hebrew University of Jerusalem as a fellow of the Lady Davis foundation, and in 1996/97 he visited the Free University of Berlin as a Humboldt fellow.

Currently he is one of the program directors at the National Science Foundation (NSF), responsible for combinatorics, foundations, and probability.

His wife Joanna Kania-Bartoszyńska is the NSF program director for topology and geometric analysis.

Scientific work
Bartoszyński's work is mainly concerned with forcing, specifically with applications of forcing to the set theory of the real line.   He has written about 50 papers in this field, as well as a monograph: 
 Tomek Bartoszyński and  Haim Judah: Set theory. On the structure of the real line. A K Peters, Ltd., Wellesley, MA, 1995. xii+546 pp.

See also
Cichoń's diagram
Baire property

References

External links
Home page
 CV (PDF)

Polish set theorists
American logicians
Polish logicians
Polish emigrants to the United States
1957 births
Mathematical logicians
20th-century American mathematicians
21st-century American mathematicians
Living people
University of Warsaw alumni
21st-century Polish philosophers